The United Wrestling Network (UWN) is a governing body for professional wrestling promotions in the United States and Japan that formed in 2013.

History
On October 21, 2013, David Marquez, promoter of Championship Wrestling from Hollywood (CWFH), announced the creation of a new governing body called the United Wrestling Network (UWN). Similar to the National Wrestling Alliance (NWA), of which CWFH was formally a member promotion, the UWN sees its affiliated promotions "pool their resources" and work together to secure national television advertising. For a wrestling company to join the group, they must have a television broadcast agreement or agree to produce their own broadcasts. Soon after its formation, an offshoot promotion called Championship Wrestling from Arizona was launched. In the summer of 2014, CWFH announced a tournament to crown the first UWN World Heavyweight Champion, who would be recognized across the UWN's affiliates.

On August 10, 2020, UWN announced a partnership with the NWA to produce Primetime Live, a series of events aired weekly from Long Beach, California at the Thunder Studios. Debuting on September 15, Primetime Lives first event saw NWA Worlds Heavyweight Champion Nick Aldis defend the title against Mike Bennett in the main event. On the October 13 Primetime Live event, David Marquez revealed the UWN World Championship for the first time and announced an eight-man tournament to crown the inaugural champion. The tournament and inaugural championship was won by Chris Dickinson.

During the summer of 2021, UWN announced the launch of Championship Wrestling from Atlanta, which will air on Peachtree TV, and be taped from Center Stage in Atlanta, Georgia. On July 15, Marquez announced on Twitter that Championship Wrestling from Atlanta would premiere on Saturday September 2 at 10 p.m 

On February 17, 2022, UWN announced in a press release that they will be merging the Hollywood, Arizona and Atlanta Championship Wrestling programs into a singular broadcast called Championship Wrestling presented by CarShield. The first taping for the new show will take place at the Irvine Improv in Irvine, California on March 22.

Championships

Members

Current

Former

See also
List of independent wrestling promotions in the United States

References

External links

United Wrestling Network
American professional wrestling promotions
Sports organizations established in 2013
2013 establishments in the United States